Sutonocrea duplicata is a moth in the family Erebidae. It was described by Max Gaede in 1928. It is found in Colombia.

References

Moths described in 1928
Phaegopterina